Aben Eubanks is an American Grammy-nominated musician, songwriter, and producer. Eubanks began his career as a guitarist for Matt Nathanson in 2004 and for Graham Colton in 2005. In 2006, Eubanks joined Kelly Clarkson's band and together co-wrote several songs including "Sober" from the My December album, "Under the Mistletoe" a duet with Brett Eldredge, "Santa, Can't You Hear Me", a duet with Ariana Grande, both songs charted on the Billboard Holiday Hot 100. and appeared on the album When Christmas Comes Around which was nominated for a 2023 Grammy for the Best Tradtional Pop Vocal Album. Eubanks also co-wrote "Broken Hearts" with Shane McAnally and Ashley Arrison, which Chevel Shepherd performed on the fifteenth season of The Voice, which reached number one on the Billboard Country Digital Songs Sales Chart.

Discography 

source:

References

American singer-songwriters
Guitarists from Texas
Living people
Record producers from Texas
Songwriters from Texas
Year of birth missing (living people)